Fukui Cave is a significant paleolithic site located in Fukui, Yoshii-cho near Sasebo, Japan from the early incipient Jōmon period. Humans have been occupying the site since at least 30,000 years ago Pottery discovered at this site dates back to around 12,700 years ago and are among the oldest found in the world.
The steep cliffs of the cave are made of sandstone, and in the surrounding area is found volcanic basalt from the late Miocene era. Landslides over the years have changed the flow of the Fukui river, forming the present shape of the caves. During lithic times, the cave was surrounded by temperate forests with ample amounts of chestnuts, walnuts and acorns.

Discovery and excavation
A shrine was constructed in 1936, and the soil was dug about 1 meter deep. Local historian Junichi Matsuse sifted through the soil finding pottery and arrowheads. An excavation was conducted by a team of archeologists from the Japanese Archaeological Association in 1964 revealing significant neolithic artifacts.

From February 2011 to 2016 the cave was re-excavated by digging a 6 meter trench and analyzed using recent technology. New discoveries included identification of animal and plant remains, hearths, as well as using photogrammetry to identify stratigraphy helping to understand formation of the cave.

The 6 meter trench consisted of 15 layers that covered the time periods from 10,000-19,000 years ago. 70,000 artifacts have been recovered, mostly microblades, but also a hearth, stone paving, wild boar teeth, and pottery. Clear signs of human occupation of the cave are found around 18,000-19,000 years ago in layer 12 and 13. Around 17,500 years ago, a landslide near the cave triggered the fall of the cave ceiling and sand and dirt buildup within the cave ceiling. 

Numerous microblades have been found between 14,000 and 16,000 in layer 2 and 3 along with the first signs of pottery. The cave is believed to be the location of a 16th century shrine that formed part of the boundary of the nearby Naoya castle, which is the predecessor of the current shrine. Layers 5 and 6 are sterile, but layer 7 and below contain additional microblades, created using a different manufacture technique from previous layers.

Significance

Fukui cave and nearby Senpukuji Cave offer excellent examples of ceramic development in Japan among the Jōmon people. Carbon 14 dating on pottery has shown it to be about 12,700 years old. Pottery remnants found were critical in confirming the transition from the pottery having slender clay ridges to that having fingernail-like impressions. The earliest examples found at the cave were not cord-marked pottery, but decorated with appliqué of dots or strips of clay. Pottery examined by CT scan found fibers from a species of fern kneaded into the clay. One clay disc and two sandstone discs with a hole in the center whose use is unknown were also discovered, a rare find in prehistory.

There is evidence of an association between microblade technology and the development of pottery.

Galleries

References

Nagasaki Prefecture
 Nagasaki